Eastland Center, formerly Westfield Eastland/Eastland Shopping Center, is a shopping center in West Covina, California, currently managed by Pine Tree, LLC.

Westfield America, Inc., a precursor to Westfield Group, acquired the shopping center in 1998 and renamed it "Westfield Shoppingtown Eastland", dropping the "Shoppingtown" name in June 2005.

Once a fashionable department store-anchored regional shopping mall, in 1997 it was converted to a power center as the nearby Plaza at West Covina became the dominant area center. It was once anchored by a five-story May Company department store, where the Target now stands. Uniquely, the power center is two levels, with parking for the lower level on the south side of the center and parking for the upper level on the north side. Corridors connect both the upper and lower levels.

History
Eastland Center was designed by architect Albert C. Martin and opened in 1957 as an outdoor mall along the San Bernardino Freeway (U.S. Route 60 and U.S. Route 99, later Interstate 10). It opened with a 5-level May Company on the east end of the mall, and 2-Level W.T. Grant on the west end. This mall was unique at the time, as it had a regular mall on the upper level, and a strip center on the lower level facing the freeway. The Paul Cummins Huddle restaurant chain had a location in the parking area where a TGIFridays now stands. An outparcel structure, known as the Avenue Shops, was located in the northwest parking area and included a Hiram's Supermarket.

The mall was enclosed and expanded in 1979 with a Robert's department store (a Long Beach-based chain) being installed in previously existing space at the center of the mall. W.T. Grant had closed in 1976 and was converted into shops on the upper level. The Avenue Shops outparcel was renamed the Street Shops. It now housed a Lucky Market, Longs Drugs, the Five Lanterns Chinese cuisine restaurant and small shops.

In the early 1980s, Mervyn's department store was added on to the west end of the mall, next to the old W.T. Grant location. This brought out the first of the big box locations on the lower level, with Office Depot moving into the W.T. Grant lower level, and Marshalls taking lease to the center shops. The early-1980s also saw one of Southern California's few ShowBiz Pizza Places opening at Eastland, known as PJ Pizzazz.  After PJ closed, it became the Safari Bar nightclub. It is currently BJ's Restaurant & Brewhouse. The May Company garage was converted into Chili's. Later down the line, Ross Dress for Less and Famous Footwear finished off the lower level. In the mid-1980s, Sportmart opened up in the basement level of the May Company store, and May used the basement for bargains only.

In 1993, May Company closed its Eastland Center location and moved to the nearby West Covina Fashion Plaza, continuing operations as the newly formed Robinsons-May chain. The ex-May location stood empty for years, with the Sportmart continuing to operate in its former basement. In 1997, the upper level of the mall was permanently closed. The Sportmart was closed and ex-May location was torn down, except for the basement level, and the upper level became Target. The entire center was big boxed. The Disney family play center Club Disney was built in the space just west of where The May Co was located, opening on February 15, 1998, only to be closed less than two years later to be replaced by Circuit City. This location now houses a PetSmart, Dollar Tree, The Habit and Pacific Fish Grill. Mervyns continued, and other national chains, such as Levitz (replacing Loehmann's) and Babies "R" Us took up spots in the upper level. Local sporting goods Chick's (Now renamed to "Dick's") is also on the second level. Burlington Coat Factory took up shop in the former basement of the May Company.

In November 2012, West Covina's first Walmart opened at the Eastland Center at 120,000 sq ft, replacing Mervyn's which closed in 2009 as a result of the chain's bankruptcy.

Public Transit Access

References

Power centers (retail) in the United States
Shopping malls in the San Gabriel Valley
Shopping malls established in 1957
West Covina, California